Daniel Charles Whitmer (born November 23, 1955) is a baseball coach and former professional baseball player. He played parts of two seasons in Major League Baseball, 1980 for the California Angels and 1981 for the Toronto Blue Jays, primarily as a catcher.

After his baseball playing career, Whitmer worked in the Detroit Tigers organization. After starting the 1984 season playing for the Tigers' Double-A farm team, the Birmingham Barons, he was named the bullpen catcher for the eventual 1984 World Series champions on June 15. He was also the team's bullpen coach from 1992–1994.

Notes

Sources

1955 births
Living people
American expatriate baseball players in Canada
Major League Baseball catchers
California Angels players
Toronto Blue Jays players
Detroit Tigers coaches
Salinas Angels players
El Paso Diablos players
Salt Lake City Gulls players
Syracuse Chiefs players
Knoxville Blue Jays players
Birmingham Barons players
Baseball players from California
Cal State Fullerton Titans baseball players
Major League Baseball bullpen catchers
Anchorage Glacier Pilots players